Below is a list of notable footballers who have played for Genoa C.F.C.. Generally, this means players that have played 100 or more league matches for the club. However, some players who have played fewer matches are also included; this includes players that have had considerable success at other clubs, and players who have appeared at least once in the FIFA World Cup.

''Players are listed according to the date of their first-team debut for the club. Appearances and goals are for first-team competitive domestic league matches only; wartime and playoff matches are excluded. Substitute appearances included. Players whose name is in bold currently play for the club.

Key
 GK — Goalkeeper
 DF — Defender
 MF — Midfielder
 FW — Forward

Nationalities are indicated by the corresponding FIFA country code.

References and notes

 
Genoa
Association football player non-biographical articles